Elliott Lester is a British film and television director best known for directing the film Blitz. He began his career directing music videos, before making his film debut in 2006 with Love Is the Drug.

Career 
Lester made his feature film directing in 2006 with a drama film Love Is the Drug. In 2011, he directed the crime thriller Blitz from a script by Nathan Parker, starring Jason Statham and Paddy Considine.

In 2014, Lester directed the HBO's drama film Nightingale, starring David Oyelowo.

Lester has also directed a drama thriller film, titled 478 from a script by Javier Gullón, which starred Arnold Schwarzenegger. The film was released in 2017 retitled Aftermath.

Filmography 
 2006: Love Is the Drug
 2011: Blitz
 2014: Nightingale
 2017: Sleepwalker
 2017: Aftermath

Music videos 
 2003: "Why Not" by Hilary Duff
 2004: "With You" by Jessica Simpson
 2005: "Over My Head (Cable Car)" by The Fray
 2007: "Nobody Do It Better" by Keith Murray featuring Tyrese and Junior
 2008: "A Beautiful Lie" by Thirty Seconds to Mars (co-directed by Jared Leto)
 2008: "Tell Me Something I Don't Know" by Selena Gomez
 2018: "Head Above Water" by Avril Lavigne
 2019: "I Fell in Love with the Devil" by Avril Lavigne

References

External links 
 

Living people
Year of birth missing (living people)
British film directors
British television directors
British music video directors